Tamkuhi Raj is a constituency of the Uttar Pradesh Legislative Assembly covering the city of Tamkuhi Raj in the Kushinagar district of Uttar Pradesh, India.

Tamkuhi Raj is one of five assembly constituencies in the Deoria Lok Sabha constituency. Since 2008, this assembly constituency is numbered 331 amongst 403 constituencies.

Currently this seat belongs to [] candidate Asim Kumar, who won in last Assembly election of 2022 Uttar Pradesh Legislative Elections by defeating Samajwadi party candidate by a margin of 66000 votes.

Member of Legislative Assembly

Election results

2022

2017

2012

References

External links
 

Assembly constituencies of Uttar Pradesh
Kushinagar district